Bhalessi (with variants Bhaleshi and Bhalesi) may refer to:
 a resident of the Bhalessa region of Jammu and Kashmir, India
 Bhalessi dialect, spoken there

See also 
 Balesi language, spoken in Ethiopia and South Sudan